Laura Carli (29 May 1906 – 15 August 2005) was an Italian actress and dubber. She appeared in more than thirty films from 1944 to 1974.

Selected filmography

References

External links 

1906 births
2005 deaths
Italian film actresses